The 2011 Black Reel Awards, which annually recognize and celebrate the achievements of black people in feature, independent and television films, took place in Washington, D.C. on February 10, 2011. Tyler Perry's For Colored Girls broke the record for most nominations with 14. This was the first ceremony where no Oscar-nominated performances were nominated.

Winners and nominees
Winners are listed first and highlighted in bold.

References

2011 in American cinema
2011 awards in the United States
Black Reel Awards
2010 film awards